is a Japanese professional footballer who plays as a winger or a left back for Hokkaido Consadole Sapporo.

References

External links

1997 births
Living people
Japanese footballers
Association football midfielders
Hokkaido Consadole Sapporo players
J1 League players
Universiade medalists in football
Universiade gold medalists for Japan
Medalists at the 2019 Summer Universiade